The Sembawang Group Representation Constituency is a five-member Group Representation Constituency (GRC) located in the northern area of Singapore. The GRC consists: Sembawang Central, Sembawang West, Woodlands, Admiralty and Canberra divisions. It also encompasses a section of Singapore's northern territorial waters in the Straits of Johor. The current MPs are from the People's Action Party (PAP) Ong Ye Kung, Vikram Nair, Lim Wee Kiak, Poh Li San and Mariam Jaafar.

Members of Parliament

Electoral results

Elections in 2020s

Elections in 2010s

Elections in 2000s

Elections in 1990s

Elections in 1980s

References
2011 General Election's result
2006 General Election's result
2001 General Election's result
1997 General Election's result
1991 General Election's result
1988 General Election's result

Singaporean electoral divisions
Mandai
Sembawang
Simpang
Sungei Kadut
Woodlands, Singapore
Yishun